Murray is the name of several cities:

United States
 Murray City, Ohio
 Murray, Indiana
 Murray, Iowa
 Murray, Kentucky
 Murray, New York
 Murray, Utah

See also
 Murray Hill (disambiguation)
 Murray Town (disambiguation)